This is a list of all cricketers who have played first-class or List A cricket for North Zone cricket team.

Last updated at the end of the 2015/16 season.

A–F

 Hemu Adhikari
 Habib Ahmed
 Imtiaz Ahmed
 Maqsood Ahmed
 Zulfiqar Ahmed
 Hyder Ali
 Mushtaq Ali
 Lala Amarnath
 Mohinder Amarnath
 Rajinder Amarnath
 Surinder Amarnath
 Anup Singh
 Atma Singh
 Parvinder Awana
 Bharat Awasthy
 Kirti Azad
 M. R. Baig
 Surinder Bali
 Bantoo Singh
 Inderjit Barhoke
 Jaswant Bawa
 Naishad Baxi
 Arun Bedi
 Bishan Singh Bedi
 Samiullah Beigh
 Amit Bhandari
 Prakash Bhandari
 Yogendra Bhandari
 Prem Bhatia
 Rajat Bhatia
 Vishal Bhatia
 Manohar Bhide
 Bhupinder Singh
 Bhupinder Singh
 Bhupinder Singh
 Puneet Bisht
 Manvinder Bisla
 Sivaji Bose
 Sanjay Budhwar
 Ravinder Chadha
 Yuzvendra Chahal
 Samir Chakrabarti
 Malhotra Chamanlal
 Unmukt Chand
 M. T. Chandrubhan
 Mohan Chaturvedi
 Chetan Chauhan
 Vedraj Chauhan
 Aakash Chopra
 Deepak Chopra
 Nikhil Chopra
 Prashant Chopra
 Sapan Chopra
 Yogendra Chowdhury
 Nari Contractor
 Vijay Dahiya
 Daljinder Singh
 Daljit Singh
 Vijay Dandekar
 Ashu Dani
 Bal Dani
 Kapil Dev
 Rahul Dewan
 Ramesh Dewan
 P. K. Dharmalingam
 Pankaj Dharmani
 Shiraz Dharsi
 Rishi Dhawan
 Shikhar Dhawan
 Paras Dogra
 Sumeet Dogra
 Ravi Dutt

G–L

 Chandrasekhar Gadkari
 Gagandeep Singh
 Gautam Gambhir
 Ashok Gandotra
 Sudhakar Ghag
 Rajinder Ghai
 Feroze Ghayas
 Harold Ghosh
 William Ghosh
 Hari Gidwani
 Sanjay Gill
 Karan Goel
 Rajinder Goel
 Manpreet Gony
 Ashwani Gupta
 Gurkeerat Singh
 Gurpal Singh
 Gursharan Singh
 Rakesh Handa
 P. Hansraj
 Harbhajan Singh
 Harcharan Singh
 Hargopal Singh
 Harvinder Singh
 Anwar Hussain
 Ian Dev Singh
 Inayat Khan
 Gokul Inder Dev
 Inderjit Singh
 Kumar Indrajitsinhji
 Jenni Irani
 Ajay Jadeja
 Jagteshwar Singh
 Jahangir Khan
 Pradeep Jain
 Vineet Jain
 Jaskaran Singh
 Jaswant Singh
 Ajay Jha
 Jitender Singh
 Jiwanjot Singh
 Rakesh Jolly
 Obaid Kamal
 Sarul Kanwar
 Aashish Kapoor
 Ashwini Kapoor
 Abdul Kardar
 Siddarth Kaul
 Uday Kaul
 Kavaljit Singh
 Amarjit Kaypee
 Khan Mohammad
 Anil Khanna
 Balbir Khanna
 Surinder Khanna
 Arun Khurana
 Gogumal Kishenchand
 Lalchand Kohli
 Virat Kohli
 Om Kumaria
 Budhi Kunderan
 Soumendranath Kundu
 Sarabjit Ladda
 Fazal Lakda
 Akash Lal
 Arun Lal
 Chuni Lal
 Madan Lal
 Muni Lal
 Raman Lamba
 Vinay Lamba
 Suresh Luthra

M–R

 Chandan Madan
 Fazal Mahmood
 Surjit Majithia
 Akash Malhotra
 Ashok Malhotra
 Vikramjeet Malik
 Mandeep Singh
 Mithun Manhas
 Maninder Singh
 C. B. Mathur
 Ajay Mehra
 Gulshan Mehra
 Manav Mehra
 Madan Mehra
 Ramprakash Mehra
 Vijay Mehra
 Ashwini Minna
 Amit Mishra
 Vikas Mishra
 Mohammad Saeed
 Dinesh Mongia
 V. M. Muddiah
 G. Murtaza
 Abid Nabi
 Yogesh Nagar
 Arjun Naidu
 Chetanya Nanda
 Satish Nanda
 Sumit Narwal
 Navdeep Singh
 Manu Nayyar
 Rajeev Nayyar
 Nazar Mohammad
 Ashish Nehra
 Sandir Om Prakash
 Rajinder Pal
 Rajat Paliwal
 Dhruv Pandove
 M. P. Pandove
 Dhiraj Parsana
 Iftikhar Ali Khan Pataudi
 Mansur Ali Khan Pataudi
 Harshal Patel
 Sudhir Pathak
 Yadavindra Singh
 Dattu Phadkar
 Bhaskar Pillai
 Manoj Prabhakar
 Prithviraj
 Rajesh Puri
 Abdul Qayoom
 Kanwar Rai Singh
 Vijay Rajindernath
 Rajinder Singh
 Sachin Rana
 Vasant Ranjane
 Parvez Rasool
 Vikram Rathour
 Ajay Ratra
 Mahesh Rawat
 Maharaja Razdan
 Vivek Razdan
 Ravneet Ricky
 Robin Singh

S–Z

 Rohit Sahni
 Nitin Saini
 Rahul Sanghvi
 Sangram Singh
 Pradeep Sangwan
 Sarabjit Singh
 Sarandeep Singh
 Dipankar Sarkar
 Daljit Singh Saxena
 Laxmi Chand Saxena
 Ramesh Saxena
 Virender Sehwag
 Apoorva Sengupta
 Shafiq Khan
 Mohammad Shahid
 Gajendra Singh Shaktawat
 Shakti Singh
 Amit Sharma
 Ajay Sharma
 Arun Sharma
 Bipul Sharma
 Chetan Sharma
 Chinmoy Sharma
 Ishant Sharma
 Joginder Sharma
 Manish Sharma
 Mohit Sharma
 Mukesh Sharma
 Manohar Sharma
 Rahul Sharma
 Rajesh Sharma
 Sandeep Sharma
 Sandeep Sharma
 Sonu Sharma
 Sumeet Sharma
 Sanjeev Sharma
 Vineet Sharma
 Yashpal Sharma
 Sher Mohammad
 Anand Shukla
 Rakesh Shukla
 Mayank Sidhana
 Navjot Singh Sidhu
 Mahesh Inder Singh
 Ravi Inder Singh
 V. R. V. Singh
 Ponnuswami Sitaram
 Reetinder Singh Sodhi
 Sunny Sohal
 Anant Solkar
 Vijay Sondhi
 Man Sood
 Kate Srikant
 Satyanarayana Subramanya
 C. Sudhakar Rao
 Venkat Sunderam
 Sunny Singh
 Surendranath
 Surendra Singh
 Surindernath
 Pawan Suyal
 Narain Swamy
 Swaranjit Singh
 Sarkar Talwar
 Ashok Thakur
 Pankaj Thakur
 Vikas Tokas
 Tuljaram
 Umesh Kumar
 Amit Uniyal
 Sunil Valson
 Gaurav Vashisht
 Nakul Verma
 Bharati Vij
 Chander Vijay
 Rajiv Vinayak
 Hiralal Vohra
 Manan Vohra
 Atul Wassan
 Chester Watson
 Vijay Yadav
 Yashpal Singh
 Yograj Singh
 Yuvraj Singh

References

North Zone cricketers